John Lee Clayton Jr. (born August 20, 1952) is an American jazz musician, classical double bassist, arranger, and composer.

He is the father of pianist Gerald Clayton and the brother of saxophonist Jeff Clayton, with whom he formed The Clayton Brothers; and The Clayton–Hamilton Jazz Orchestra with Jeff Hamilton.

Music

Clayton began studying double bass at age 16 with Ray Brown. Three years later, he was bassist on the Henry Mancini's television series The Mancini Generation. In 1975, he graduated from Indiana University.

He went on to tour with the Monty Alexander Trio and the Count Basie Orchestra, before taking the position of principal bass in the Amsterdam Philharmonic Orchestra in Amsterdam, Netherlands. After five years he returned to the U.S. for a break from the classical genre and, in 1985, co-founded the Clayton-Hamilton Jazz Orchestra with his brother, saxophonist Jeff Clayton, and drummer Jeff Hamilton. He also performed in a duo as the Clayton Brothers with musicians such as Bill Cunliffe and Terell Stafford.

He has been Artistic Director for the Lionel Hampton Jazz Festival, Sarasota Jazz Festival, Santa Fe Jazz Party, Jazz Port Townsend Summer Workshop, Jazz at Centrum and Vail Jazz Workshop. From 1999 to 2001, he was the Artistic Director of Jazz for the Los Angeles Philharmonic program at the Hollywood Bowl. He conducted the All-Alaska Jazz Band. He has taught at the University of Southern California Thornton School of Music and has served as president of the International Society of Bassists.

He has composed and arranged for The Count Basie Orchestra, Diana Krall, Whitney Houston, Carmen McRae, Nancy Wilson, Joe Williams, Ernestine Anderson, Quincy Jones, Dee Dee Bridgewater, Natalie Cole, Till Bronner, and The Tonight Show Band.

In 2006, his son Gerald Clayton came in second at the Thelonious Monk International Jazz Piano Competition.

Awards
In 2007, Clayton won a Grammy Award for Instrumental Arrangement Accompanying Vocalist(s) for the song "I'm Gonna Live Till I Die" by Queen Latifah. In December 2009, Brother to Brother by the Clayton Brothers received a Grammy nomination for Best Jazz Instrumental Album, Individual or Group.

Discography

As leader or co-leader
With The Clayton Brothers
 1991 The Music
 1997 Expressions
 2000 Siblingity
 2005 Back in the Swing of Things
 2008 Brother to Brother

With Clayton-Hamilton Jazz Orchestra
 1990 Groove Shop 
 1991 Heart and Soul
 1995 Absolutely!
 1999 Explosive! with Milt Jackson
 2000 Shout Me Out!
 2005 Live at MCG
 2009 Charles Aznavour & The Clayton-Hamilton Jazz Orchestra
 2011 Sundays in New York with Trijntje Oosterhuis

As guest
With Monty Alexander
 1976 Live! Montreux
 1983 Reunion in Europe
 1983 The Duke Ellington Songbook
 1985 The River Monty
 1986 Li'l Darlin

With Milt Jackson
 1977 Soul Fusion 
 1993 Reverence and Compassion
 1988 Bebop
 1994 The Prophet Speaks

With Diana Krall
 1993 Stepping Out 
 1999 When I Look in Your Eyes
 2004 The Girl in the Other Room
 2005 Christmas Songs
 2006 From This Moment On
 2009 Quiet Nights
 2020 This Dream of You

With others
 1978 Live in Japan '78, Count Basie
 1979 Get Together, Count Basie
 1982 Indiana, Jeff Hamilton
 1985 A Gentleman and His Music, Benny Carter
 1987 Spontaneous Combustion, Barney Kessel
 1988 Isn't It Romantic, Michael Feinstein
 1988 Rockin' L.A., Jimmy Witherspoon
 1988 Show Tunes, Rosemary Clooney
 1989 Boogie Down, Ernestine Anderson
 1989 Live at Town Hall N.Y.C., Gene Harris
 1989 Sings Rodgers Hart & Hammerstein, Rosemary Clooney
 1989 The Jiggs Up, Jiggs Whigham
 1990 Plays the Benny Carter Songbook, Marian McPartland
 1991 The Star-Spangled Banner, arr. Super Bowl XXV, Whitney Houston
 1991 Unforgettable... with Love, Natalie Cole
 1992 In Tribute, Diane Schuur
 1993 A Single Woman, Nina Simone
 1993 A Touch of Music in the Night, Michael Crawford
 1993 Take a Look, Natalie Cole
 1993 Dream Come True, Arturo Sandoval
 1994 Self Portrait, Carmen Lundy
 1994 Super, Ray Brown
 1995 Afterglow, Dr. John
 1995 New Gold, Bud Shank
 1995 Time After Time, Etta James
 1996 Bud Shank Sextet Plays Harold Arlen, Bud Shank
 1997 Dear Ella, Dee Dee Bridgewater
 1997 SuperBass, Ray Brown
 1997 Blue Moon Swamp, John Fogerty
 1998 This Christmas, Ann Hampton Callaway
 1998 Manilow Sings Sinatra, Barry Manilow
 1998 12 Songs of Christmas, Etta James
 2004 Renee Olstead, Renee Olstead
 2005 It's Time, Michael Bublé
 2006 Before Me, Gladys Knight
 2006 Dear Mr. Sinatra, John Pizzarelli
 2006 Easy to Love, Roberta Gambarini
 2012 Kisses on the Bottom, Paul McCartney
 2014 Life Journey, Leon Russell
 2014 The Last Southern Gentlemen, Delfeayo Marsalis
 2017 I Fall in Love Too Easily, Katharine McPhee
 2022 Bells On Sand, Gerald Clayton

See also
 List of music arrangers
List of jazz bassists

References

External links
Official site
Official biography
Jeff Hamilton
John Clayton Interview by breakthruradio.com
John Clayton Interview - NAMM Oral History Library (2009)

American jazz double-bassists
Male double-bassists
American music arrangers
Big band bandleaders
Jacobs School of Music alumni
USC Thornton School of Music alumni
Living people
1952 births
21st-century double-bassists
21st-century American male musicians
American male jazz musicians
Clayton-Hamilton Jazz Orchestra members